The Church of the Faroe Islands is one of the smallest state churches in the world. Prior to becoming independent on 29 July 2007, it was a diocese of the Church of Denmark, a Lutheran church. As of 2019, 79.7% of the Faroe Islanders belonged to the state church.

Other churches in the Faroe Islands include the Plymouth Brethren and the Roman Catholic Church.

History

Christianization

According to Færeyinga saga, the Viking chief Sigmundur Brestisson brought Christianity to the Faroe Islands. On the orders of the Norwegian king Olaf Tryggvason, Sigmundur forced the island people to convert to Christianity in 999. Resistance to the new religion led by the notorious Tróndur í Gøtu was quickly suppressed, and even though Sigmundur himself lost his life, Christianity gained a foothold.

Catholic era

Some years after the introduction of Christianity, the Faroese church was established as a diocese, with an episcopal residence in Kirkjubøur, and suffragan to several metropolitical sees in succession, but eventually (after 1152) subject to the archdiocese of Nidaros (Tróndheim). There were probably 33 bishops in the Faroe Islands between the time Christianity was introduced to the islands and the Reformation.

This period was not always peaceful. The sagas of the Faroe Islands contain two accounts of the way the church took possession of a large proportion of the land, overtaxing the people so harshly that it led to open rebellion. The saga of the battle of Mannafallsdal relates that the bishop (probably Bishop Erlend, appointed in 1269) was killed outside his church by the rebels. The historical value of this saga is highly debatable - but it does serve to illustrate the conflict between the theocratic church and an impoverished population. However, there is reasonable documentation of the fact that the bishop's residence in Kirkjubø was burnt to the ground by the rebels, and that Erlend was removed from the islands by order of the King. Erlend died in Bergen in 1308.

The Reformation

In 1538, the last Catholic bishop in the Faroe Islands was removed from his position. His Protestant replacement only lasted a few years, and then he left the islands as well, as a dean took over as the representative of the church under the Bishop of Zealand in Denmark.

Lutheran Church
The orthodox Lutheran form of Christianity, propounded by the Zealand bishop Jesper Brochmand, gained a strong foothold in the Faroe Islands, and lasted longer there than in the rest of the Kingdom of Denmark. Brochmand's devotional book, dating back to about 1650 and Thomas Kingo's hymns from 1699 constituted a significant proportion of the spiritual life of the islands right up until the twentieth century. Indeed, the expression Brochmandslestur is still used to describe long and, as some might perceive them, boring texts and speeches.

Nationalist revival

When the Danish trade monopoly was lifted in 1856, Faroese society started to boom both economically and culturally. The restoration of long-suppressed Faroese culture also led to changes in Christianity on the islands. After great contention, Faroese was given the same status as Danish in hymns and preaching in 1924–25. The ecclesiastical rituals (christening, burial, marriage etc.) were introduced in Faroese in 1930, and in 1961, the authorised Faroese edition of the Bible was published. During the first half of the 20th century, dean Jákup Dahl had translated the New Testament from Greek, and published it in 1937. Dahl also translated the psalms from the Old Testament, and after his death in 1944, a vicar named Kristian Osvald Viderø continued to translate the rest of the Bible from Hebrew. In 1963, the first Faroese hymn book was published, and in the same year, the old title of dean was upgraded to deputy bishop. In 1977, the first female vicar was ordained, and in 1990, the Faroe Islands became an independent diocese with its own bishop within the Church of Denmark.

In 2005, the Faroes signed a treaty with Denmark that allowed for the take over of most public institutions, including the Vágar Airport and the People's Church. On 29 July 2007, on the date of the national holiday - Ólavsøka, the Faroese Church became totally independent of the Church of Denmark.

Current leadership
The Bishop (Biskupur) of the Faroe Islands is the Right Reverend Jógvan Fríðriksson, who is the church's chief pastor. Born on 19 February 1957, he was ordained in 1985 and worked as a parish priest on the Faroese island of Eysturoy. He was consecrated as bishop in 2007, and is the first bishop of the independent Church of the Faroe Islands, following its independence from the Church of Denmark. The Bishop's seat is at Tórshavn Cathedral.

The Cathedral Dean (Dómpróstur) of Tórshavn Cathedral is the Very Reverend Uni Næs. The Dean is the second most senior cleric, deputising for the Bishop in his absence, and sits ex officio on the Church of the Faroe Islands ministerial council.

There are around twenty-five ordained priests serving the churches and chaplaincies of the Church of the Faroe Islands. Around 60 churches and chapels are grouped into 14 parishes across the country. The Church of the Faroe Islands clergy directory lists 25 parish priests (Sóknarprestur), of whom one also serves as hospital chaplain, and one as diocesan exorcist.

Bishops

 1540-1556, Jens Riber, first Lutheran Bishop of the Faroe Islands
 1556-1990, Faroe Islands incorporated into the Diocese of Copenhagen
 1990-2007, Hans Jacob Joensen, as a diocese of the Church of Denmark
 2007-present, Jógvan Fríðriksson, as an autonomous single-diocese Lutheran church

Notable clergymen

Lucas Debes (1623-1675), Provost of the Faroes, issued the first book about the archipelago.
V. U. Hammershaimb (1819-1909), Provost of the Faroes, invented the modern Faroese grammar.
Fríðrikur Petersen (1858-1917), Provost of the Faroes, poet and politician.
Jákup Dahl (1878-1944), Provost of the Faroes, Bible translator.
Kristian Osvald Viderø (1906-1991), theologian, finished Dahl's translation.

See also

Other Nordic national Lutheran churches
 Church of Denmark
 Church of Sweden 
 Church of Iceland
 Church of Norway
 Evangelical Lutheran Church of Finland

References

External links

 
Photo-site Faroese Churches

Protestantism in the Faroe Islands
Christian organizations established in 2007
Faroe Islands
Faroe Islands
Religious organizations based in the Faroe Islands